Stephen A. Erickson is an American philosopher. He is an emeritus professor of philosophy at Pomona College in Claremont, California, where he held the E. Wilson Lyon Professor of the Humanities and Professor of Philosophy title. He is known for his lectures in The Great Courses titled "Philosophy as a Guide to Living". He received his Ph.D. in Philosophy from Yale University.

Bibliography
 Language and Being: An Analytic Phenomenology, 1970
 The (Coming) Age of Thresholding, 1999
 Human Presence & Boundaries, Mercer University Press, 1984
 Philosophy as a Guide to Living, two parts, 2006

References

External links
 Faculty page at Pomona College

Phenomenologists
Living people
21st-century American philosophers
20th-century American philosophers
Continental philosophers
Daseinsanalysis
Existentialists
Philosophy academics
Heidegger scholars
Philosophers of technology
Yale Graduate School of Arts and Sciences alumni
Pomona College faculty
Postmodernists
Year of birth missing (living people)